A by-election was held for the New South Wales Legislative Assembly electorate of Glen Innes on 4 November 1903 because of the death of Francis Wright.

Dates

Result

Francis Wright died.

See also
Electoral results for the district of Glen Innes
List of New South Wales state by-elections

Notes

References

1895 elections in Australia
New South Wales state by-elections
1890s in New South Wales

1903 elections in Australia
1900s in New South Wales